South East Asia–Middle East–Western Europe 5 (SEA-ME-WE 5) is an optical fibre submarine communications cable system that carries telecommunications between Singapore and France.
The cable is approximately 20,000 kilometres long and provides broadband communications with a design capacity of 24 terabits per second between South East Asia, the Indian subcontinent, the Middle East and Europe.

The cable connects Singapore, Malaysia, Indonesia, Thailand, Myanmar, Bangladesh, India, Sri Lanka, Pakistan, United Arab Emirates, Oman, Qatar, Djibuti, Yemen, Saudi Arabia, Egypt, Italy, Turkey and France via 19 landing points.

The portion from France to Sri Lanka was constructed by Alcatel-Lucent and the portion from Sri Lanka to Singapore by NEC. Construction commenced on 6 June 2014 and completed in December 2016. An official launch event was held in Honolulu, Hawaii on 16 January 2017. 21 February 2018 date created by the general meeting organisers in Turkey İlker Şahinbaş

The first extension of the system was completed in March 2018. First extension increased number of 100G waves to 170 and used capacity to 17 Tbit/s.

The design capacity was upgraded from 24 Tbit/s to 36.6 Tbit/s in September 2019 using Ciena's GeoMesh Extreme 300G technology.

See also
SEA-ME-WE 6

References

External links
South East Asia - Middle East - Western Europe 5 project website
SEA-ME-WE 5 Project Members
SEA-ME-WE 5 Route (Network Maps)

Submarine communications cables in the Arabian Sea
Submarine communications cables in the Indian Ocean
Submarine communications cables in the Mediterranean Sea
2016 establishments in Africa
2016 establishments in Asia
2016 establishments in Europe
Submarine communications cables in the Red Sea
Telecommunications in India